Masbate is a province in the Philippines.

Masbate may also refer to:

 Masbate City, capital city of Masbate province
 Masbate Island, one of the three major islands that comprises the Masbate province
 Masbate Airport

See also
 Masbateño (disambiguation)

See also
 Masbate language (disambiguation)